Yuriy Oleksandrovych Makhynya (born 1 January 1961) is a Ukrainian retired professional footballer.

Honours
 Soviet Top League champion: 1981.
 Soviet Top League runner-up: 1982.
 Soviet Cup winner: 1988 (played in the early stages of the 1987/88 tournament for FC Metalist Kharkiv).
 USSR Federation Cup finalist: 1987.

1961 births
Living people
Sportspeople from Mykolaiv
Soviet footballers
Ukrainian footballers
Association football defenders
FC Vorskla Poltava players
FC Bukovyna Chernivtsi players
FC Dynamo Kyiv players
FC Metalist Kharkiv players
SC Tavriya Simferopol players
ŠK Futura Humenné players
FC Kremin Kremenchuk players
Soviet Top League players
Soviet First League players
Soviet Second League players
Ukrainian Premier League players
Soviet expatriate footballers
Expatriate footballers in Czechoslovakia
Soviet expatriate sportspeople in Czechoslovakia